Oryol Oblast, also known as Orlovshchina, is a federal subject of Russia (an oblast). Its administrative center is the city of Oryol. Population:

Geography 

It is located in the southwestern part of the Central Federal District, in the Central Russian Upland.

In terms of area, at  it is one of the smallest federal subjects.

Kaluga Oblast border it to the north-west; Tula Oblast is located to the north; Lipetsk Oblast — to the east; Kursk Oblast — to the south, and Bryansk Oblast is to the west.

Climate 
The climate is temperate (Köppen: Dfb). Rainfall averages , and snow cover averages 120 days.

Hydrography 
The rivers of the region belong to the basins of three rivers: Volga, Don, Dnieper.

The Oka river, one of Europe's largest rivers, flows through the oblast for part of its course (190 km) and the source of it is in the south of the region. Main tributaries: Zusha (with tributary Neruch), Vytebet, Nugr, Tson, Orlik, Rybnitsa, Kroma.

Sosna flows in the eastern part of the region. Main tributaries: Trudy, Tim, Lyubovsha, Kshen, Olym.

In the west of the region originate rivers Nerussa, Navlya, Swapa.

History

In the 12th century, chronicles mention Mtsensk, known as Novosil then. Then modern Orlovschina was part of the Chernigov Principality. After the death of Mikhail of Chernigov Novosil Principality was formed on these territories. By the end of the 15th century it had disintegrated into four separate principalities and, along with all the other fragments of the Chernigov principality, became a part of Grand Duchy of Lithuania. In the 16th century, the fortress town of Oryol was founded, and the town of Livny, destroyed in the 13th century, was restored. In the 16th and 17th centuries, the territory of modern Oryol was the borderland of the Tsardom of Russia, with many fortifications of the Great Abatis Line . With the reduction of the threat posed by the Tatars, agricultural activity of the area had intensified.
It was created in 1937 by uniting a selection of territories of three other oblasts: Kursk Oblast, Western Oblast, and Voronezh Oblast. It also included present Bryansk Oblast between 1937 and 1944.

Politics

During the Soviet period, the high authority in the oblast was shared between three persons: The first secretary of the Oryol CPSU Committee (who in reality had the biggest authority), the chairman of the oblast Soviet (legislative power), and the Chairman of the oblast Executive Committee (executive power). Since 1991, CPSU lost all the power, and the head of the Oblast administration, and eventually the governor was appointed/elected alongside elected regional parliament.

The Charter of Oryol Oblast is the fundamental law of the region. The Oryol Oblast Council of People's Deputies is the province's standing legislative (representative) body. The Legislative Assembly exercises its authority by passing laws, resolutions, and other legal acts and by supervising the implementation and observance of the laws and other legal acts passed by it. The highest executive body is the Oblast Government, which includes territorial executive bodies such as district administrations, committees, and commissions that facilitate development and run the day to day matters of the province. The Oblast administration supports the activities of the Governor of Oryol Oblast, who is the highest official and acts as guarantor of the observance of the oblast Charter in accordance with the Constitution of Russia.

The head of administration of Oryol Oblast between 1993 and 2009 was Yegor Stroyev. Stroyev led the region for more than 20 years. In 1985 he became the first secretary of the regional committee of the CPSU, and after three years (in 1989-1991 he worked as secretary of the Central Committee of the CPSU), in 1991 he returned to Oryol, worked as the director of the Institute of Horticultural Crops Selection, and later was elected governor. On February 16, 2009 Russian President Dmitry Medvedev accepted Stroyev's voluntary retirement and nominated Alexander Kozlov as his replacement, which was approved by the Oryol Regional Council of People's Deputies.

Administrative divisions 

 3 cities under the oblast's jurisdiction
 24 districts
 13 urban-type settlements
 223 rural settlements

Economy 
The main industries in Oryol Oblast are the food and light industries, engineering and metalworking, and ferrous and nonferrous metallurgy. The engineering and metalworking industries manufacture production equipment for various industries, forklift trucks, construction and agricultural equipment, and machinery for municipal services. Numerous companies in the instrument-making and electronics sectors maintain high scientific and technical potential with the latest high-end technologies and experienced specialists. First digital telephone exchange was introduced in the oblast in 1998.

Agriculture 
Most of the oblast's agricultural land is used for plant cultivation. Grain growing is very important, with winter wheat and rye being the main crops. Buckwheat, oats, barley, and potatoes are also grown, and sugar beets are in great demand. The area planted in feed grains is increasing due to the expansion of livestock farming, which includes beef and dairy cattle farming, pig farming, sheep farming for meat and wool, poultry farming, and horse breeding.

Transport 
Pipelines and power transmission lines are routed through the region's largest oil-trunk pipeline Druzhba (202 km in area). In the southwestern part of the area lies a small section of the Urengoy - Pomary - Uzhgorod pipeline.

Oryol is a major hub of pipelines exporting to Belarus, Western Ukraine and the Baltic states, with branches passing through Bryansk and Kursk.

Automotive 

As of 2016, the motorization level of the area was of 314 cars per 1000 people, which is the 15th of any region of Russia and above the national average (285).

Main roads of the region:
  "Crimea" (152 km through Mtsensk, Oryol, Kromy, Trosna)
  Oryol — Tambov (151 km through Livny)
  Oryol — Vitebsk (57 km through Naryshkino)
  Kaluga — Oryol (67 km through Bolkhov)
  Trosna — Kalinovka (12 km)
 54А-1 Oryol — Yefremov (158 km through Zalegoshch, Novosil)

Railway 

The main line is the double track electrified main line Moscow - Kharkiv - Simferopol (136 km through Mtsensk, Oryol, Zmievka and Glazunovka).

Other lines:
 Oryol — Yelets (130 km through Zalegoshch, Verkhovye, Khomutovo and Krasnaya Zarya)
 branch in Livny and Dolgoye
 historical Riga — Oryol (64 km through Naryshkino and Khotynets)
 Oryol — Dmitriyev (83 km through Kromy)
 Kursk Oblast — Kolpna (20 km)

Demographics

Population: 714,094 (est.2022); 

2017
Births: 7 143 (9.56 per 1000)
Deaths: 11 839 (15.84 per 1000) 

Russians - 96.1%
Ukrainians - 1%
Others - 2.9%
17,468 people were registered from administrative databases, and could not declare an ethnicity. It is estimated that the proportion of ethnicities in this group is the same as that of the declared group.

According to a 2012 survey, 40.9% of the population of Oryol Oblast adheres to the Russian Orthodox Church, 5% are unaffiliated generic Christians, 1% are Orthodox Christian believers who don't belong to church or belong to non-Russian Orthodox churches, 1% are adherents of the Rodnovery (Slavic native faith) movement, and 1% are Old Believers. In addition, 34% of the population declares to be "spiritual but not religious", 8% is atheist, and 9.1% follows other religions or did not give an answer to the question.

References

External links

 
 Overview of Oryol Oblast (Kommersant newspaper)
 Central Eurasian Information Resource: Images of Oryol Oblast - University of Washington Digital Collection

 
States and territories established in 1937
1937 establishments in the Soviet Union